The Seventh Chronicle (Sedma kronika) is a 1996 Croatian film directed by Bruno Gamulin, starring Rene Medvešek, Alma Prica and Sven Medvešek.

External links
 

1996 films
1990s Croatian-language films
Films based on Croatian novels
Films set on islands
Croatian drama films
1996 drama films